The University of Nursing, Yangon (formerly The Institute of Nursing, Yangon) is a nursing university, located in Lanmadaw Township, Yangon, Myanmar. It is one of three universities in the country that offers a four-year bachelor's degree program in nursing (i.e. B.N.Sc (Generic)). The UON - Yangon also offers a master's degree program in nursing and diploma programs in dental, EENT, mental health, pediatrics, critical care, and orthopedics. Moreover, there is a two-year B.N.Sc (Bridge) program for in-service nurses who have earned a nursing diploma.

The university, which admits only 150 students per year for generic program, is one of the most selective universities in the nation. Nursing is one of few professions in Myanmar that provides decent job opportunities—inside or outside the country. The matriculation marks required for admission in 2013 was 440 out 600, slightly below what was required to go to medical school. For in-service nurses who want to enroll for the B.N.Sc (Bridge) program must have at least two-year service for the government and need to sit selection exam which is usually held in October/November of every year.

History
The Yangon Institute of Nursing was established as the Nurses Training Center in 1986, and was upgraded to university status in 1991. In 1994 it became the first medical training facility in the country to offer a four-year, full-time BNSc degree program.

Programs
The university offers undergraduate and graduate degrees in various fields of nursing.
Bachelor of Nursing Science (BNSc)
Master of Nursing Science (MNSc)
Diploma in Speciality Nursing (dental, EENT, mental health, pediatrics, critical care, orthopedics)

Courses undertaken at the University of Nursing are eligible for credit transfers towards courses taken at the Open University of the UK.

See also
Each of the following nursing universities also takes in 100 students per year.

University of Nursing (Mandalay)
Defence Services Institute of Nursing and Paramedical Science

References

Universities and colleges in Yangon
Medical schools in Myanmar
Universities and colleges in Myanmar